Claude Wiseler (born on 30th January, 1960 in Luxembourg City) is a Luxembourgish politician. He has been a member of the Christian Social People's Party (CSV) since 1983, and served in the government led by Jean-Claude Juncker until 2013.

He attended the Athénée de Luxembourg, before studying literature in Paris. He returned to the Athénée to teach language in 1983, which he continued to do until 1988. From 1987 to 1999, he served as an adviser to the government on educational issues. He became General Secretary of the Christian Social People's Party in 1995.

He was elected to the Chamber of Deputies in the 1999 election, finishing sixth amongst CSV candidates in the Centre constituency, where six CSV deputies were elected. In the communal elections of October 1999, Wiseler was elected to Luxembourg City's communal council in third-place amongst CSV candidates (six were elected); he was appointed as an échevin in the DP-CSV administration, and served in this position from 1st January, 2000 until 30 July, 2004.

He was comfortably re-elected to the Chamber of Deputies in the 2004 election, placing second amongst CSV candidates in a CSV landslide victory, and appointed to the new cabinet to hold the positions of Minister for the Civil Service and Administrative Reform and Minister for Public Works. After the 2009 election, Wiseler was reappointed to the government in the enlarged role of Minister for Sustainable Development and Infrastructure, which includes his former portfolio of Public Works.

Footnotes

External links

 Chamber of Deputies official website biography 

|-

|-

Ministers for Public Works of Luxembourg
Members of the Chamber of Deputies (Luxembourg)
Members of the Chamber of Deputies (Luxembourg) from Centre
Councillors in Luxembourg City
Christian Social People's Party politicians
Luxembourgian educators
Alumni of the Athénée de Luxembourg
1960 births
Living people
People from Luxembourg City